Hammatoderus inermis is a species of beetle in the family Cerambycidae. It was described by James Thomson in 1857. It is known from Nicaragua and Mexico.

References

Hammatoderus
Beetles described in 1857